Heiwa is a 2002 album by jazz fusion band Greetings From Mercury.  It is the second release compiled in the 11-CD box edited by De Werf the same year.  It was also distributed as a simple album by Bang Records (with a different cover).

Track listing
"One by One"
"my Mojo=my Dojo" 
"Tanger la Nuit"
"Cold Rain DNA" 
"Heiwa"
"We Must" 
"Closer"
"2001"
"Darkhauns (alap-jod-jahla)"
"Everyone's World"

Personnel
 Jeroen Van Herzeele - tenor saxophone, leader
 Peter Hertmans - guitar
 Otti Van Der Werf - electric bass
 Stéphane Galland - drums
 Steven Segers - rap
 Michel Andina - sitar
 DJ Grazzhoppa - wheelz of steel on 6,7 and 10

External links
 Jazz in Belgium website

Greetings From Mercury albums
2002 albums